The Rialto Theatre is a 1,200-seat theater in South Pasadena, California. Located on Fair Oaks Avenue, it is considered one of the last single-screen theaters in Southern California and is listed on the National Register of Historic Places.

History
The Rialto was built in 1925 by Lewis A. Smith, who was also architect for the Vista Theater on Sunset Boulevard. The Rialto's architectural style was described in The Los Angeles Times as "an odd mashup of Spanish Baroque and Egyptian kitsch." The theater has an orchestra pit and its original design featured balcony seating along both sides of a deep stage. The interior has several original murals and a drinking fountain made of Batchelder tile.

The Rialto was operated by Landmark Theatres until it closed in 2007. The Simpsons Movie was the last movie shown in the theater, and 200 people attended the final screening. The building was closed to the public in 2010, after part of the facade fell onto the sidewalk. There have been two fires in the building, and it survived an attempt in 1977 to turn it into a parking lot.

Izek Shomof, a developer of older buildings in downtown Los Angeles, purchased the Rialto in December 2014. Shomof indicated he will turn the property into an entertainment venue that will include a bar and possibly a theater to screen old movies.

Since 2017, the theater has served as one of six campuses for Mosaic, a non-denominational multi-site church based in Los Angeles.

In popular culture
In 1983's Michael Jackson's Thriller, the scene where Michael and Ola Ray watch a film was shot there. In 2016 the Rialto was featured as a location in key scenes of the hit movie musical La La Land. It was also used as a filming location in The Rocketeer (1991), The Player (1992) and Scream 2 (1997).

References

Movie palaces
Cinemas and movie theaters in Los Angeles County, California
Cinema of Southern California
Theatres completed in 1925
1925 establishments in California
Baroque Revival architecture in the United States
Buildings and structures on the National Register of Historic Places in Los Angeles County, California
Theatres on the National Register of Historic Places in California